Eseosa Mandy Aigbogun (born 23 May 1993) is a Swiss football forward, playing for Paris FC in the French Division 1 Feminine and for the Switzerland national team.

Club career

Aigbogun started her career playing for FC Zürich and later FC Basel, both in the Swiss Nationalliga A. Since her debut in September 2013, a 9–0 win over Serbia, she has been a member of the Switzerland national team.

Aigbogun rejected a transfer offer from SC Freiburg of the Frauen-Bundesliga in 2014.

She eventually moved to Germany in 2016, signing for Turbine Potsdam.

International career
She was concerned that a failure to settle abroad could cost her a place in the Swiss national squad for the 2015 FIFA Women's World Cup, where she scored one goal against Ecuador.

Personal life
Aigbogun's father emigrated from Nigeria to work as a pastor in Zürich. Therefore, she was eligible to play for the Nigerian national team, before deciding to represent Switzerland.

References

External links

 
 

1993 births
Living people
Swiss women's footballers
Swiss people of Nigerian descent
Sportspeople of Nigerian descent
Switzerland women's international footballers
2015 FIFA Women's World Cup players
Footballers from Zürich
Women's association football forwards
Expatriate women's footballers in Germany
Swiss expatriate sportspeople in Germany
FC Zürich Frauen players
Swiss Women's Super League players
Paris FC (women) players
Expatriate women's footballers in France
Swiss expatriate sportspeople in France
Division 1 Féminine players
FC Basel Frauen players
1. FFC Turbine Potsdam players
Frauen-Bundesliga players
UEFA Women's Euro 2022 players
UEFA Women's Euro 2017 players
Swiss expatriate women's footballers